Ahmad Zahir (born 25 March 2001) is an Afghan cricketer. He made his first-class debut for Boost Region in the 2018 Ahmad Shah Abdali 4-day Tournament on 13 March 2018. He made his List A debut for Kandahar Province in the 2019 Afghanistan Provincial Challenge Cup tournament on 1 August 2019.

References

External links
 

2001 births
Living people
Afghan cricketers
Place of birth missing (living people)